The Republican Social Party of French Reconciliation (PRSRF) was a French political party founded in 1945 by former members of François de La Rocque's French Social Party (PSF) who wished to continue the pre-war PSF.

The PRSRF participated in the Rally of Republican Lefts (RGR) before disappearing for good. Its members joined the "moderate" (right-wing) parties of the Fourth Republic such as the CNI.

Defunct political parties in France
Right-wing parties in France
Political parties established in 1945